Juwan Christopher Morgan (born April 17, 1997) is an American professional basketball player for the Ontario Clippers of the NBA G League. He played college basketball for the Indiana Hoosiers.

Early life and high school career
Morgan is the son of Darren and Lynn Morgan, both who had served in the United States Army. He grew up playing football as a wide receiver and quarterback. By the time he was 13, Morgan was 6'3 and began to focus more on basketball. He joined AAU squad MOKAN Basketball, based in Kansas City, Missouri. Morgan became a star player at Waynesville High School. As a junior, Morgan earned Springfield News-Leader's postseason team and the American Family All-USA Ozarks honors. He was a Rivals.com four-star recruit and was the 16th ranked power forward in his class. On September 10, 2014, Morgan verbally committed to play college basketball at Indiana University, choosing the Hoosiers over the likes of Vanderbilt University and Creighton University, among others.

College career
Morgan averaged 2.4 points and 2.1 rebounds per game as a freshman. He improved his averages to 7.7 points and 5.6 rebounds per game as a sophomore. Morgan was forced to play many minutes at the center position as a junior due to a season-ending injury to De’Ron Davis. Morgan scored a then career-high 28 points on November 22, 2017, in an 87-70 win over Arkansas State. On December 16, Morgan recorded 34 points and 11 rebounds in an 80-77 overtime win over Notre Dame in the Crossroads Classic. He was named  NBCSports.com National Player of the Week as well as Big Ten Conference Player of the Week. Morgan was named to the Second Team All-Big Ten by the coaches and media. He averaged 16.5 points and 7.4 rebounds per game as a junior. After the season Morgan declared for the 2018 NBA draft but did not hire an agent and ultimately opted to return to school.

In the offseason before his senior season, Morgan received the “Off-season Champions” Award for his work in the conditioning program. He was named to the Preseason All-Big Ten team.

In Morgan's senior year he was named the USBWA Oscar Robertson National Player of the week on December 17, the Big Ten Player of the Week, Preseason All Big Ten, and is Ranked 7th best senior by ESPN.com.

Professional career

Salt Lake City Stars (2019)
After going undrafted in the 2019 NBA draft, Morgan was named in the Utah Jazz mini-camp roster for 2019 NBA Summer League. On August 21, 2019, Morgan signed an Exhibit 10 contract with the Jazz. He was waived in the preseason, on October 17, 2019, then added to the roster of their NBA G League affiliate, the Salt Lake City Stars and opening night roster

Utah Jazz (2019–2021)
On November 21, 2019, Morgan signed a two-way contract with the Utah Jazz, spending the rest of the season with the Jazz and the Salt Lake City Stars. On December 1, 2020, he re-signed with the Jazz.

Maine Celtics (2021)
On September 28, 2021, Morgan signed with the Boston Celtics. However, he was waived on October 16. On October 23, Morgan signed with the Maine Celtics. In 13 games, he averaged 12.6 points on .559/.388/.867 shooting, 7.0 rebounds, and 2.3 assists in 31.6 minutes per game.

Toronto Raptors (2021–2022)
On December 22, 2021, Morgan signed a 10-day contract with the Toronto Raptors.

Boston / Maine Celtics (2022)
On January 1, 2022, Morgan was reacquired by the Maine Celtics after his 10-day contract expired. On March 28, he signed a 10-day contract with the Boston Celtics. On April 9, he signed a multi-year deal with the Celtics, allowing him to play through the playoffs. The Celtics reached the 2022 NBA Finals, but lost to the Golden State Warriors in 6 games.

On July 9, 2022, Morgan was traded, alongside Nik Stauskas, Aaron Nesmith, Malik Fitts, Daniel Theis and a 2023 first-round pick, to the Indiana Pacers in exchange for Malcolm Brogdon. On July 14, Morgan was waived by the Pacers.

Ontario Clippers (2022–present)
On September 24, 2022, Morgan signed with the Los Angeles Clippers, but was released 12 days later on October 4.

On October 24, 2022, Morgan joined the Ontario Clippers training camp roster.

Career statistics

NBA

Regular season

|-
| style="text-align:left;"| 
| style="text-align:left;"| Utah
| 21 || 0 || 6.4 || .577 || .375 || .750 || 1.4 || .3 || .0 || .1 || 1.7
|-
| style="text-align:left;"| 
| style="text-align:left;"| Utah
| 29 || 0 || 5.1 || .467 || .308 || .429 || 1.0 || .3 || .1 || .0 || 1.2
|-
| style="text-align:left;"| 
| style="text-align:left;"| Toronto
| 1 || 0 || 27.0 || .667 || .500 ||  || 4.0 || 1.0 || .0 || .0 || 5.0|-
| style="text-align:left;"| 
| style="text-align:left;"| Boston
| 1 || 0 || 4.0 ||  ||  ||  || .0 || .0 || .0 || .0 || .0
|- class="sortbottom"
| style="text-align:center;" colspan="2"| Career
| 52 || 0 || 6.0 || .525 || .348 || .545 || 1.2 || .3 || .1 || .1 || 1.5

Playoffs

|-
| style="text-align:left;"| 2020
| style="text-align:left;"| Utah
| 7 || 2 || 12.4 || .250 || .200 || .333 || 3.0 || .7 || .3 || .0 || 1.4|-
| style="text-align:left;"| 2021
| style="text-align:left;"| Utah
| 2 || 0 || 3.0 ||  ||  ||  || 1.0 || .5 || .0 || .0 || 1.4
|-
| style="text-align:left;"| 2022
| style="text-align:left;"| Boston
| 9 || 0 || 1.7 || .000 || .000 || .500''' || .3 || .0 || .0 || .0 || .1
|- class="sortbottom"
| style="text-align:center;" colspan="2"| Career
| 18 || 2 || 5.9 || .231 || .182 || .375 || 1.4 || .3 || .1 || .0 || .6

References

External links 

Indiana Hoosiers bio

1997 births
Living people
American expatriate basketball people in Canada
American men's basketball players
Basketball players from Missouri
Boston Celtics players
Indiana Hoosiers men's basketball players
Maine Celtics players
People from Waynesville, Missouri
Power forwards (basketball)
Salt Lake City Stars players
Toronto Raptors players
Undrafted National Basketball Association players
Utah Jazz players
United States men's national basketball team players